The Internet Party (Partido de Internet in Spanish) is a political party founded on November 22, 2009, in Spain that tries to develop a liquid democracy system within the current legal system. The Internet Party has no ideology.  They support an open list system where the elected members act representing the decisions taken by citizens in the Internet platform.

During the Spanish general election 2011, the Internet Party presented 8 candidates in the electoral district of Cádiz and received 603 votes (0.09%).

See also
 List of direct democracy parties
 Direct democracy
 e-Democracy
 Demoex

References

2009 establishments in Spain
Direct democracy parties
Political parties established in 2009
Political parties in Spain
Politics and technology